Espen Minde (born 16 May 1983) is a Norwegian football midfielder who currently plays for Tromsdalen UIL.

A former u-21 international for Norway, Minde started his senior career in Tromsø IL and featured with them in the Norwegian Premier League. He failed to break through, although he in 2003 was near a transfer to K.A.A. Gent after impressing during a trial. Instead, he spent time on loan at Bodens BK and Raufoss. He later joined Tromsdalen UIL, and then Løv-Ham in November 2007, ahead of the 2008 season. In January 2009 he went on trial at FC Wil 1900.

Minde is left-footed.

References

1983 births
Living people
Norwegian footballers
Sportspeople from Tromsø
Tromsø IL players
Tromsdalen UIL players
Raufoss IL players
Løv-Ham Fotball players
Expatriate footballers in Sweden
Norwegian expatriate sportspeople in Sweden
Norwegian expatriate footballers
Norwegian Sámi sportspeople
Eliteserien players

Association football forwards